Aleksite (IMA symbol: Alk) is a rare lead bismuth tellurium sulfosalt mineral with formula PbBi2Te2S2.

References

Sulfosalt minerals
Bismuth minerals
Trigonal minerals
Minerals in space group 164